Saharat Kanyaroj (born June 9, 1994), simply known as Farm, is a Thai professional footballer who plays as an attacking midfielder for Thai League 1 club Nakhon Ratchasima.

International career

In 2016 Saharat was selected in Thailand U23 squad for 2016 AFC U-23 Championship in Qatar.

References

External links
 

1994 births
Living people
Saharat Kanyaroj
Saharat Kanyaroj
Association football midfielders
Saharat Kanyaroj
Saharat Kanyaroj